Nottingham is a city in England, and the county town of Nottinghamshire. 

Nottingham may also refer to:

Places

United Kingdom
Nottingham (UK Parliament constituency), 1295–1885
Nottingham (European Parliament constituency), 1979–1994

United States
Nottingham, Indiana
Nottingham, Maryland
Nottingham, Prince George's County, Maryland
Nottingham, New Hampshire
Nottingham, New Jersey
Nottingham, Ohio
Nottingham, West Virginia
Nottingham Township, Harrison County, Ohio
Nottingham Township, Pennsylvania
East Nottingham Township, Pennsylvania
West Nottingham Township, Pennsylvania
Livermore, California, formerly Nottingham

People
Earl of Nottingham, a title in the Peerage of England, including a list of men who have borne this title
Edward Nottingham (born 1948), United States federal judge
Jacob Nottingham, American baseball player

Ships
, various Royal Navy ships
, a merchant ship sunk in 1941
, a merchant ship scrapped in 1971
, an East Indiaman

Fiction
Sheriff of Nottingham, the fictional villain in the Robin Hood legend
Ian Nottingham, a character from the Witchblade comic and television series
Robin Hood (2010 film) (original title: Nottingham)

Other uses
Nottingham (HM Prison), a Category B men's prison in Nottingham, England
Nottingham (speedway), a 1930s motorcycle racing team
Nottingham Cooperative, a housing cooperative in Madison, Wisconsin
"Nottingham Lace", a song by guitarist Buckethead from the 2005 album Enter the Chicken
Nottingham system, a modification of the Bloom–Richardson grading system for breast tumors

See also
Mottingham, a district of London